Redigobius is a genus of fish in the goby family, Gobiidae, known commonly as dualspot gobies. They are native to the western Indo-Pacific region, where they occur in estuaries and freshwater habitats just above the tidal influence.

Some of these gobies are abundant fish species. The most widespread is the speckled goby (R. bikolanus), which occurs throughout the western Pacific Ocean and from Australia to Africa. Some Redigobius are kept as aquarium pets. The Fijian endemic Lever's goby (R. leveri) is featured on the ten-dollar bill in the 2013 series of Fijian currency.

Species
There are currently 14 recognized species in this genus. In a 2010 revision the genus was reduced to 12 species and two more were described as new.

Species include:

 Redigobius amblyrhynchus (Bleeker, 1878)
 Redigobius balteatops (J. L. B. Smith, 1959) (bull goby)
 Redigobius balteatus (Herre, 1935) (rhinohorn goby)
 Redigobius bikolanus (Herre, 1927) (speckled goby)
 Redigobius chrysosoma (Bleeker, 1875) (spotfin goby)
 Redigobius dewaali (M. C. W. Weber, 1897) (checked goby)
 Redigobius dispar (W. K. H. Peters, 1868)
 Redigobius lekutu Larson, 2010
 Redigobius leveri (Fowler, 1943) (Lever's goby)
 Redigobius macrostoma (Günther, 1861) (large-mouth goby)
 Redigobius nanus Larson, 2010
 Redigobius oyensi (de Beaufort, 1913)
 Redigobius penango (Popta, 1922)
 Redigobius tambujon (Bleeker, 1854) (Roemer's goby)

References

 
Gobionellinae
Taxa named by Albert William Herre
Taxonomy articles created by Polbot